Estadio Francisco Villa is a baseball stadium in Durango City, Durango, Mexico. It is the home field of the Generales de Durango baseball team, which competes in the Mexican League and the Alacranes de Durango of the Liga Mayor de Béisbol de La Laguna. It holds 4,983 spectators.

References

Baseball venues in Mexico
Mexican League ballparks